Jagmohan Singh (1 April 1932 – 17 November 2020) was an Indian hurdler. He competed in the men's 110 metres hurdles at the 1960 Summer Olympics.

Singh died on 17 November 2020 at the age of 88.

References

External links
 

1932 births
2020 deaths
Athletes (track and field) at the 1960 Summer Olympics
Indian male hurdlers
Olympic athletes of India
Place of birth missing
20th-century Indian people